The Australia cricket team toured India in January 2020 to play three One Day International (ODI) matches. Normally, Australia would have played the matches at home, but international fixture congestion caused the ODIs to be brought forward. India won the series 2–1, after losing the opening match by ten wickets. During the third and final ODI of the series, Virat Kohli scored his 11,208th run across all formats as a captain in international cricket, the most by a batsman for India.

Squads

Ahead of the tour, D'Arcy Short was named as the replacement for Sean Abbott in Australia's squad, after Abbott suffered side-strain. Prior to the second ODI, K. S. Bharat was called up to the Indian squad as a cover for Rishabh Pant, who was ruled out of the match with a concussion.

ODI series

1st ODI

2nd ODI

3rd ODI

References

External links
 Series home at ESPN Cricinfo

2020 in Australian cricket
2020 in Indian cricket
Australian cricket tours of India
Indian cricket seasons from 2000–01
International cricket competitions in 2019–20